Robert Shapland George Julian Carew, 3rd Baron Carew KP DL (15 June 1860 – 29 April 1923) was an Anglo-Irish nobleman.

He was born in Dublin, the elder son of Robert Shapland Carew, 2nd Baron Carew and his wife Emily Anne Philips, daughter of Sir George Richard Philips, 2nd Baronet. He was educated at Trinity College, Cambridge. He was Deputy Lieutenant of County Wexford, residing at the family seat, Castleboro House.

Family

He married Julia Mary Lethbridge, daughter of Albert Arthur Erin Lethbridge and Jane Hill on 27 June 1888 at St. George's, Hanover Square, London. Julia was born in Hamilton, Ontario on 9 October 1863. She spent several years as a child in Persia, where her great-uncle Charles Alison (1810-1872) was British minister. She was educated in England. A miniature of Julia, by C. Turrell, was exhibited at the Royal Academy of Arts, London, 1900. A portrait and sketch of her appeared in "Men and Women of the Day" (London : 1889). The Carew Spinel of the Mughal emperors bought in Persia by her relative was bequeathed to the V&A in 1922 by Lady Carew.

The couple had no children.  On his death the baronies passed to his younger brother George Patrick John Carew, 4th Baron Carew.

Notes

References 
Kidd, Charles & Williamson, David (eds.) (1990) Debrett's Peerage and Baronetage (1990 edition). New York: St Martin's Press,

External links
 

1860 births
1923 deaths
People educated at Eton College
Alumni of Trinity College, Cambridge
Deputy Lieutenants of Wexford
Knights of St Patrick
Robert 3
Eldest sons of British hereditary barons